Elsa Asenijeff (Elsa Maria Packeny 3 January 1867 in Vienna, Austria-Hungary – 5 April 1941 in Braunsdorf), was an Austrian writer and partner of Max Klinger.

Life 
Elsa Maria Packeny came from the Viennese bourgeoisie. Her father Karl Packeny was director of the Austrian Southern Railway. Until 1887 she attended the Vienna teacher training center.

After she had refused some marriage proposals, her parents forced her to marry. In 1890 she married the eleven years older Bulgarian engineer and diplomat Ivan Johann Nestoroff and went with him to Sofia. The marriage was not happy. She felt at the mercy of her husband, a theme that influenced her literary works in many ways. In 1896 her narrative volume Is That Love? under the pseudonym Elsa Asenijeff, which she had chosen in memory of her deceased firstborn son Asen.

In 1896 she divorced Nestoroff. The Bulgarian state allowed her to use Asenijeff as her official name. In 1897 she went to Leipzig to study philosophy and economics. Her second son Heraclitus, born in 1896,  left her with the grandparents.

At a Literary Society festival in Leipzig for Detlev von Liliencron (1844–1909) and Frank Wedekind (1864–1918), she met the painter and sculptor Max Klinger (1857–1920). She became a model, muse and lover for him. Klinger did not make the relationship public. He paid for her expensive apartment in the prestigious music district (270 m2 in Schwägrichenstraße 11, Hochparterre). She accompanied him on numerous trips and worked as a hostess at social events. She was considered an extremely impressive, fascinating, sometimes even extravagant personality. Their daughter Désirée was born on 7 September 1900, during a longer stay in Paris. She was given to a French foster mother.

In 1903, Klinger purchased a vineyard in Großjena, including a winegrower's cottage, which he converted into a normal residential building in order to be able to withdraw from the hectic city life of Leipzig with Asenijeff. More books of hers appeared. From 1912 she also wrote poetry. Guests of their salon were, among others, the three young poets Walter Hasenclever (1890-1940), Kurt Pinthus (1886–1975) and Franz Werfel (1890–1945).

An alienation between Klinger and Asenijeff deepened further when Klinger in 1911 chose 18-year-old Gertrud Bock (1893–1932) as a model and constant companion, whom he married a few months before his death. In 1916, the final break between Asenijeff and Klinger.

This separation met Elsa Asenijeff mentally and materially very difficult, because Klinger denied her any further support. In 1917 she had to give up the apartment in the Dufourstraße 18, in which she had moved in 1909. She only lived on a pension. She began a descent into poverty, associated with a certain decay of personality. Even a poetry book published in 1922 brought no change.

Elsa Asenijeff was completely isolated, had no connection to her Viennese relatives, and her daughter Désirée, who spent some time in Leipzig for the funeral of her father in 1920, did not make any closer contact with her. Lease debts eventually led to admission to the Psychiatric Clinic of the University of Leipzig. Her incapacitation considered her a fraud and claimed damages because she still considered herself one of the greatest female writers. A two-year stay in the Leipzig-Dösen hospital, followed in 1926 by the transfer to Hubertusburg and finally as "nicht gemeingemefährlich" in the supply Colditz. In 1933, the competent authorities relocated this facility to Bräunsdorf near Freiberg as a "Correctional Institution for asocial and unwilling adults".

Works 

 Ist das Liebe? Kleine psychologische Erzählungen und Betrachtungen. 2. Auflage. Friedrich, Leipzig 1896, (Reprint: Turmhut-Verlag, Mellrichstadt 2005)
 Sehnsucht, Wilhelm Friedrich  Verlag, Leipzig, 1898. (digitalisiert)
 . Wilhelm Friedrich Verlag, Leipzig, 1898. (Online bei ALO). (Reprint: Austrian literature online, Band 7. Austrian literature online, Graz (u. a.) s. a.).
 . Wilhelm Friedrich Verlag, Leipzig 1898. (Online bei ALO).
 Unschuld, Ein modernes Märchenbuch, Verlag Hermann Seemann Nachfolger, Leipzig, 1901. (digitalisiert)
 . Seemann, Leipzig 1902. (Online bei ALO). (Kommentierte Neuauflage: Turmhut-Verlag, Mellrichstadt 2006).
 Max Klingers Beethoven – eine kunst-technische Studie. Hermann Seemann Nachfolger, Leipzig 1902.
 Die Schwestern, eine Novelle, Magazin-Verlag Jacques Hegner, Berlin und Leipzig, 1905. (digitalisiert)
 . Müller, München 1913. (Online bei ALO).
 Hohelied an den Ungenannten, Georg Müller Verlag, München, 1914 (Reprint Nabu Press, 2012). (digitalisiert)
 Aufschrei. Freie Rhythmen. A. H. Payne, Leipzig 1922.
 Bilanz der Moderne – Gedichte aus der Anstalt, (Hrsg. Rita Jorek), Turmhut-Verlag, Mellrichstadt 2010, .
 Bo Osdrowski/Tom Riebe (Hrsg.): Elsa Asenijeff. Versensporn - Heft für lyrische Reize Nr. 19, Edition POESIE SCHMECKT GUT, Jena 2015, 120 Exemplare.

References

Sources 

 Rita Jorek: Aufschrei (Elsa Asenijeff). In: Friderun Bodeit (Hrsg.): Ich muß mich ganz hingeben können. Frauen in Leipzig. Verlag für die Frau, Leipzig 1990, S. 175–190.
 Peter Nürnberg: Traumgekrönt. Elsa Asenijeff als Schriftstellerin. In: Leipziger Blätter Heft 17/1990. (Seemann), Leipzig 1990, S. 40–43. 
 Horst Riedel: Stadtlexikon Leipzig von A bis Z. PRO LEIPZIG, Leipzig 2005, S. 27.
 Rita Jorek: Asenijeff, Elsa (1867–1941). In: Britta Jürgs (Hrsg.): Denn da ist nichts mehr, wie es die Natur gewollt. Portraits von Künstlerinnen und Schriftstellerinnen um 1900. AvivA, Berlin (u. a.) 2001, S. 53–72.
 Annegret Friedrich: Max Klinger und Elsa Asenijeff. Geschlechterdifferenz als Programm. Dem Andenken an Ursula Baumgartl gewidmet. In: Femme fatale. Entwürfe. Frauen – Kunst – Wissenschaft, Band 19. S. n., Mannheim 1995, S. 31–41, OBV.
 Elsa Asenijeff. In: Christa Gürtler, Sigrid Schmid-Bortenschlager: Eigensinn und Widerstand. Schriftstellerinnen der Habsburgermonarchie. Ueberreuter, Wien 1998, S. 201–212.
 Brigitte Spreitzer: Im Glanze seines Ruhmes … Elsa Asenijeff (1867–1941), im Zwielicht. In: Frauke Severit (Hrsg.): Das alles war ich. Politikerinnen, Künstlerinnen, Exzentrikerinnen der Wiener Moderne. Böhlau, Wien (u. a.) 1998, S. 163–201.
 Brigitte Spreitzer: ‚Kotzbrocken‘. Elsa Asenijeffs Behauptung weiblicher Denk-Eigenart wider das „große Wahngebäude“ der männlichen Wissenschaft. In: Brigitte Spreitzer: Texturen. Die österreichische Moderne der Frauen. Studien zur Moderne, Band 8, Passagen-Verlag, Wien 1999, S. 131–134. (Zugleich: Habilitationsschrift, Universität Graz, Graz 1998).
 Brigitte Spreitzer: „Nicht immer dies eine Ich sein“ … Die „kleine Kette ewiger Zersetzungsprozesse“ in den Anläufen weiblicher Selbstkonstitution bei Elsa Asenijeff. In: Spreitzer: Texturen. S. 70–78.

External links 

 Biogramm Elsa Asenijeff im Leipzig-Lexikon
 Elsa Asenijeff underFrauenpersönlichkeiten, Uni Leipzig
 

1867 births
1941 deaths
19th-century Austrian women writers
20th-century Austrian women writers
19th-century pseudonymous writers
20th-century pseudonymous writers